Maytenus harenensis is a species of plant in the family Celastraceae. It is endemic to the Harenna Forest in southeastern Ethiopia, a remnant Afromontane forest in the Bale Mountains. It is threatened by habitat loss.

References

harenensis
Endemic flora of Ethiopia
Trees of Ethiopia
Bale Mountains
Ethiopian Highlands
Afromontane flora
Vulnerable flora of Africa
Taxonomy articles created by Polbot